Group B of the 2002 Fed Cup Europe/Africa Zone Group II was one of four pools in the Europe/Africa Zone Group II of the 2002 Fed Cup. Three teams competed in a round robin competition, with the team placings determining where they will be positioned within the play-offs.

Denmark vs. Tunisia

Lithuania vs. Tunisia

Denmark vs. Lithuania

See also
Fed Cup structure

References

External links
 Fed Cup website

2002 Fed Cup Europe/Africa Zone